Cucuieți may refer to several places in Romania:

 Cucuieți, a village in Dofteana Commune, Bacău County
 Cucuieți, a village in Solonț Commune, Bacău County
 Cucuieți, a village in Plătărești Commune, Călărași County
 Cucuieți (Tazlău), a tributary of the Tazlău in Bacău County
 Cucuieți, a tributary of the Trotuș in Bacău County

and to:
 Cucuieții Noi and Cucuieții Vechi, villages in Alexăndrești Commune, Rîșcani district, Moldova

See also
 Cucueți (disambiguation)
 Cuca (disambiguation)